American Nature Association, headquartered in Washington, D.C., was the publisher of Nature Magazine from 1923 to 1959;  and a discount reseller of natural science books for its members.  It was founded by  Arthur Newton Pack and his father, Charles. Nature Magazine was an "illustrated monthly with popular articles about nature" and later, the "interpreter of the great outdoors."  A May 1924 review of the organization and its magazine, written by Carroll Lane Fenton and published in American Midland Naturalist called the magazine "excellent" with "abundant pictures, admirably printed"; and said it was a "highly worth while publication" that deserves a wide circulation among town and school libraries."

Natural History magazine absorbed Nature Magazine in January 1960.

References

External links
Covers from Nature Magazine from MagazineArt.org
Office Girls: 1925, a 1925 photograph of American Nature Association offices, from shorpy.com

Magazine publishing companies of the United States
Natural history of the United States
Publishing companies established in 1923
1923 establishments in the United States